Saint Enoder, (also known as Tenenan, Tinidor and Ternoc) was a 5th-century Cornish saint from Brecknockshire in South Wales. He is venerated in the Anglican and Roman Catholic Churches.

He is known to history mostly through the medieval lists of the children of King Brychan of Brycheiniog where he was originally called Wenheden and should not be confused with Saint Enodoc. Today, he is remembered in the name of St Enoder a parish and hamlet in Cornwall. His Feast day is the last Thursday in April.

References

Medieval Welsh saints
Medieval Cornish saints
5th-century Christian saints
Children of Brychan